The Value Added Tax Act 1994 (c 23) is a UK tax law, concerning taxation of goods and services that fall within the scope of Value Added Tax (VAT). It came into force on 1 September 1994. The Value Added Tax Act 1983 was repealed and replaced by this legislation.

Contents

Part I - The charge to tax
Part II - Reliefs, exemptions and repayments
Part III - Application of Act in particular cases.
Part IV - Administration, collection and enforcement
Part V - Appeals
Part VI - Supplementary provisions

To encourage outsourcing it provides a mechanism through which government departments, including NHS trusts, can qualify for refunds on contracted out services.

History 
The Value Added Tax Act 1994 was enacted on 30 November 1994, and came into force on 1 January 1995. It replaced the earlier VAT legislation in the UK, which had been in place since 1973.

The introduction of the Value Added Tax Act 1994 was necessary to implement the European Union's VAT system in the UK. The EU had mandated that all member states should adopt a common VAT system, in order to simplify the tax system for businesses operating across borders.

See also 
Income and Corporation Taxes Act 1988
Corporation Tax Act 2010

References

Value-added tax (United Kingdom)
United Kingdom Acts of Parliament 1994